Ashleigh Barty and Casey Dellacqua were the defending champions, but chose not to participate this year.
Chuang Chia-jung and Liang Chen won the title, defeating Nadiia Kichenok and Zheng Saisai in the final, 4–6, 6–4, [12–10].

Seeds
All seeds received a bye into the quarterfinals.

Draw

References
 Main Draw

2015 Doubles